Welf I or Welfo (died before 876) was a Swabian nobleman. He was a member of the Elder House of Welf.

Welf was probably a son of Conrad I of Auxerre, and seems to have taken over his father's offices in Swabia, namely: count of Alpgau, count of Linzgau, and possibly count of Argengau. However, when Conrad and his other sons changed allegiance from King Louis the German to King Charles the Bald in 859, Welf disappears from the historical record. It is assumed that he fell out of favor with King Louis and lost his offices; the Swabian branch of the Elder Welfs was not mentioned again until Rudolf II, Count of Altdorf, who died around 990 and was — according to legend — a descendant of Welf.

His son was Eticho, count of Ammergau (died after 911), who married Egila and had a son:
 Henry, Count of the Golden Wagon; who married Atha von Hohenwart and had issue:
 Rudolf I, Count of Altdorf, who married siburgis and had a son:
 Rudolf II, Count of Altdorf.

Sources
 The Elder House of Welf

Gallery

Elder House of Welf
Counts of Germany
9th-century deaths
Year of birth unknown